Andrei Hvostov (born 10 July 1963 in Jõhvi) is an Estonian journalist and writer.

In 1995 he graduated from University of Tartu, studied history.

As a journalist, he is worked mainly for Eesti Ekspress.

Works
 2004: novel "Lombakas Achilleus" ('Lame Achilles')
 2011: novel "Sillamäe passioon" ('Sillamäe Passion')
 2016: novel "Šokolaadist prints" ('The Chocolate Prince')

References

1963 births
Living people
Estonian journalists
Estonian male novelists
21st-century Estonian writers
University of Tartu alumni
People from Jõhvi
Estonian people of Russian descent